The double bell euphonium is a duplex instrument based on the euphonium. The larger bell produces the mellow tone of a standard euphonium; the second smaller bell has a brighter tone, similar to a baritone horn or valve trombone.  The instrument is sometimes dismissed as a novelty, but has had a small number of enthusiastic adherents, although few professional musicians use it as their sole or primary instrument.  The smaller bell can give more appropriate tone in the higher range of the instrument.  The two bells can also be used for special effects, such as echoes, and using the distinctly different tone of the two bells for a single musician to give the effect of call and response.

Construction 
The last valve on the horn (either the fourth or the fifth, depending upon the model) is used to switch the sound from the main bell to the secondary bell. Both bells cannot play at the same time because each bell usually has its own tuning slide loop, such that they can be matched adequately for consistent performance. Unlike the double horn, there is only one set of valve slides with a double bell euphonium, so only the basic pitch of the two bells can be matched.

History of the double bell euphonium

The double bell variation of the euphonium was mass-produced starting in the 1880s, first produced by the C.G. Conn company in the United States  . Other major U.S. brass-instrument manufacturers soon began production of similar instruments. The instrument was first popularized by Italian-born euphonium virtuoso Miguel Raffayolo, soloist with the Patrick Gilmore band, documented in American newspapers by 1880. Harry Whittier, also of Gilmore's band, took up the instrument by 1888; the John Philip Sousa band added the instrument the following year [Bone Paull and Morris, p. 12], with other US brass bands following the example. Peak production of the instrument was from about the 1890s into the 1920s, although it was never one of the more popular brass instruments. In the 19th century press, Raffayolo is described as inventor the instrument, known then as the "Euphonium Trombone."

Decline
The last double bell euphoniums were made around 1960.  In practice, most double bell models ended up being used with the large bell only, effectively  a very heavy single bell euphonium. 
About the second bell, famous euphonium soloist Arthur W. Lehman once said during a Marine Band concert,  "We use it to  hold our white gloves when we are not wearing them."

Soloists 
Simone Mantia used to play a double-bell euphonium as a virtuoso. While part of the Sousa and Pryor Bands, Simone at times favoured the double-belled euphonium and he even composed "Priscilla" (in tribute to Jane Priscilla Sousa), a double-bell euphonium solo.

References
 Guide to the Euphonium Repertoire: the Euphonium Source Book by Lloyd E. Bone, Eric Paull, R. Winston Morris

External links
Double Bell Euphonium Solo, "The Swiss Boy," by Lynn A. Selke, Venice, FL, Concert Band YouTube of double bell euphonium solo
Double Bell Euphonium - David Werden: Neapolitan Dance YouTube of double bell euphonium with piano accompaniment

Tubas
B-flat instruments